Ross Michael Parkinson (30 May 1948 – 17 January 2009) was a New Zealand rugby union player. Playing as a midfield back, Parkinson represented Poverty Bay at domestic level, and was a member of the New Zealand national team, the All Blacks. He represented New Zealand in 20 international matches, seven of them at full test level, from 1972 to 1973. He also played for Auckland Maori, the North Island and a combined Poverty Bay-East Coast selection against the Lions in 1971. Parkinson died on 17 January 2009 while on holiday in Northland.

References

1948 births
2009 deaths
New Zealand international rugby union players
New Zealand rugby union players
People from Wairoa
Poverty Bay rugby union players
Rugby union players from the Hawke's Bay Region